Animal passport may refer to:

Common Veterinary Entry Document
Pet passport
Horse passport